William Corfield was a footballer with tough tackling abilities who played in defence for Burslem Port Vale.

Career
Corfield joined Burslem Port Vale in October 1893. He was only used in three Second Division games of the 1893–94 season, though claimed a goal in a 6–1 victory over Grimsby Town at the Athletic Ground on 4 December. He left the club in the summer of 1894.

Career statistics
Source:

References

Year of birth missing
Year of death missing
English footballers
Association football defenders
Port Vale F.C. players
English Football League players